The Edge of the World is the second album by American actor and singer-songwriter Billy Bob Thornton.  It was released in 2003 on Sanctuary Records.Album cover model is Rebecca Wilson.

Track listing
All tracks composed by Billy Bob Thornton; except where indicated
 "Emily" (Jimmy Don Thornton)
 "Everybody Lies" (Billy Bob Thornton, Michael R. Shipp)
 "Island Avenue" (Jimmy Don Thornton)
 "The Desperate One" (Billy Bob Thornton, Brad Davis, Jim Mitchell)
 "Everybody's Talking" (Fred Neil)
 "Fast Hearts" (Billy Bob Thornton, Randy Mitchell)
 "Baby Can I Hold You" (Tracy Chapman)
 "The Edge of the World" 
 "God" 
 "Pieces of a Man" (Billy Bob Thornton, Randy Mitchell)
 "Pieces of a Man (Part II)" (Billy Bob Thornton, Randy Mitchell)
 "The Edge of the World (Reprise)"
 "Do God Wop" 
 "Savior" (Billy Bob Thornton, Randy Mitchell)
 "Midnight Train" (Billy Bob Thornton, Randy Mitchell)
 "To The End of Time" (Billy Bob Thornton, Marty Stuart)
 "The Edge of the World (Part II)" 

Edge of the World, The
Edge of the World, The
Sanctuary Records albums